Tell Saoudhi is an archaeological site 1 km north of Tell Delhamiyeh near Rayak in the Beqaa Mohafazat (Governorate). It dates at least to the Neolithic.

References

Baalbek District
Neolithic settlements
Bronze Age sites in Lebanon
Tells (archaeology)